Thomas Austin (181515 December 1871) was an English settler in Australia who is generally noted for the introduction of rabbits into Australia in 1859, even though rabbits had been brought previously to Australia by the First Fleet.

Personal life 

Thomas Austin was born at Baltonsborough, Somerset, England, the youngest son of John Austin and Nancy, née Lucas.  In 1831 he arrived with other members of his family in Hobart Town, Van Diemen's Land (now Tasmania).

Established the first ferry crossing the Derwent River, with his uncle and cousin in the township which is now Austin’s Ferry.

After farming near Ouse, Thomas and his brother James crossed Bass Strait in 1837 and settled as pioneer pastoralists in the Western District of the Port Phillip District (now called Victoria).

In 1845 he married Elizabeth Phillips Harding (1821–1910) in Melbourne and they had 11 children.

Barwon Park 
Thomas Austin took up land near Winchelsea, Victoria starting in 1837, and eventually created a run of  known as Barwon Park. The property was used for sheep and for horse training.

In 1871, work was completed on the bluestone mansion that Austin had designed and built on his property. This is now owned by the National Trust of Australia and is open to the public. He died six months after the mansion was completed but his widow continued to live there and, as a philanthropist, helped to found the Austin Hospital in Heidelberg and the Austin Homes for Women in Geelong.

Introduction of species 
As a member of the Acclimatisation Society of Victoria, Thomas Austin helped to introduce many species from England.  In 1861 he wrote that he had introduced hares, blackbirds and thrushes, and that he was breeding English wild rabbits and partridges.

He introduced 24 breeding rabbits (Oryctolagus cuniculus) on his estate in October 1859 as game for shooting parties. While other settlers praised his efforts at the time, he has borne the brunt of blame for introducing this pest to Australia. In 2022, a study of genomic data confirmed that Australia's feral rabbit population was entirely descended from the rabbits introducted by Austin.

See also 
Rabbits in Australia

References

Bibliography
Australian Dictionary of Biography – Thomas Austin
Australian Dictionary of Biography – Elizabeth Austin
Australian Heritage (Autumn 2006) article on Thomas Austin & rabbits

1815 births
1871 deaths
English emigrants to colonial Australia
People from Somerset
Australian pastoralists